Hater or Haters may refer to:

Books
 Hater, 2006 novel by David Moody
 Haters (novel), a 2006 novel by author Alisa Valdes-Rodriguez

Film and TV
 H8R, a 2011 American reality television show on the CW
 The Haters (2015 film), an Armenian teen comedy-drama film
H8RZ, 2015 American film
 The Hater, a 2020 Polish social thriller film
The Haters, also known as professional wrestling alliance the Thomaselli Brothers

Music
 Hater (band), an American rock band
 Hater (album), 1993
 The Haters, a noise music group from the US

Songs
 "Hater", a 2006 single by Everclear from the album Welcome to the Drama Club
 "Hater" (Korn song), 2014
 "Haters" (TLC song), 2017
 "Haters" (So Solid Crew song), 2002
 "Haters", a 2004 song by Hilary Duff from the album, Hilary Duff
 "Haters" (Tony Yayo song), 2011

See also
 Anti-fan
 Hader (disambiguation)
 Hatert
 Hatter
 Hatred